Tuckahoe culture was created when Algonquin-speaking Native Americans, English, other Europeans, and West Africans in the Colony of Virginia brought customs and traditions from each of their home countries and the "loosely-knit customs began to crystallize into what later became known as Tuckahoe culture". It began to develop in James River plantations and spread throughout the Tidewater and then other areas of Virginia.

Anglican planters of eastern Virginia were called Tuckahoes to differentiate them from the German, Irish and Scotch-Irish immigrants that settled in the Shenandoah Valley who called themselves Cohees. Tuckahoes were considered to be "of the Lowland old Virginians".

References

History of Virginia
American culture
Pre-statehood history of Virginia
History of the Southern United States
Virginia society
People of Virginia in the American Civil War
American regional nicknames